Linda Mary Alice Thom, née Malcolm, (born December 30, 1943) is a Canadian Olympic gold medal-winning shooter.

Born in Hamilton, Ontario, she received a Bachelor of Arts degree in 1967 from Carleton University.

At the 1984 Summer Olympics, she won a gold medal in the women's 25 m Pistol event becoming the first Canadian woman to win a gold medal in the summer Olympics since 1928 and the first Canadian to win a gold medal in the summer Olympics since 1968. She was selected to carry Canada's flag at the closing ceremonies.

In the 1995 Ontario general election, she ran as a Progressive Conservative against Dalton McGuinty for the riding of Ottawa South but was defeated.

In 1985, she was made a Member of the Order of Canada. In 1984, she was awarded the Velma Springstead Trophy, an award presented annually to Canada's outstanding female athlete, and was named female amateur athlete of the year by the Sports Federation of Canada.  In 1986, she was inducted into the City of Ottawa Sports Hall of Fame. In 1992, she was inducted into Canada's Sports Hall of Fame.

She was in the first induction of the Lisgar Collegiate Institute Athletic Wall of Fame, as part of the 160th Anniversary celebrations.

She is currently a sitting member of the Canadian Firearms Advisory Committee.

References

External links 
 
 
 CBC Radio archive clip

1943 births
Living people
Shooters at the 1984 Summer Olympics
Olympic shooters of Canada
Olympic gold medalists for Canada
Canadian female sport shooters
Canadian people of Swedish descent
ISSF pistol shooters
Progressive Conservative Party of Ontario candidates in Ontario provincial elections
Carleton University alumni
Sportspeople from Hamilton, Ontario
Members of the Order of Canada
Sportspeople from Ottawa
Women in Ontario politics
Olympic medalists in shooting
Medalists at the 1984 Summer Olympics
Pan American Games medalists in shooting
Canadian sportsperson-politicians
Pan American Games silver medalists for Canada
Pan American Games bronze medalists for Canada
Lisgar Collegiate Institute alumni
Shooters at the 1983 Pan American Games
Medalists at the 1983 Pan American Games
20th-century Canadian women